The Boy Who Cried Wolf is one of Aesop's Fables, numbered 210 in the Perry Index. From it is derived the English idiom "to cry wolf", defined as "to give a false alarm" in eBrewer's Dictionary of Phrase and Fable and glossed by the Oxford English Dictionary as meaning to make false claims, with the result that subsequent true claims are disbelieved.

The fable
The tale concerns a shepherd boy who repeatedly fools villagers into thinking a wolf is attacking his town's flock. When an actual wolf appears and the boy calls for help, the villagers believe that it is another false alarm, and the sheep are eaten by the wolf. In a later English-language poetic version of the fable, the wolf also eats the boy.

The moral stated at the end of the Greek version is, "this shows how liars are rewarded: even if they tell the truth, no one believes them". It echoes a statement attributed to Aristotle by Diogenes Laërtius in his The Lives and Opinions of Eminent Philosophers, in which the sage was asked what those who tell lies gain by it and he answered "that when they speak truth they are not believed". William Caxton similarly closes his version with the remark that "".

History
The story dates from Classical times, but, since it was recorded only in Greek and not translated into Latin until the 15th century, it only began to gain currency after it appeared in Heinrich Steinhöwel's collection of the fables and so spread through the rest of Europe. For this reason, there was no agreed title for the story. Caxton titles it "" (1484), Hieronymus Osius "The boy who lied" ("", 1574), Francis Barlow "Of the herd boy and the farmers" ("", 1687), Roger L'Estrange "A boy and false alarms" (1692), and George Fyler Townsend "The shepherd boy and the wolf" (1867). It was under the final title that Edward Hughes set it as the first of ten Songs from Aesop's Fables for children's voices and piano, in a poetic version by Peter Westmore (1965).

Teachers have used the fable as a cautionary tale about telling the truth, but an educational experiment in the first decade of the 21st century suggested that reading "The Boy Who Cried Wolf" increased children's likelihood of lying; reading about George Washington and the cherry tree, however, decreased this likelihood dramatically. The suggestibility and favourable outcome of the behaviour described, therefore, seems the key to moral instruction of the young. However, when dealing with the moral behaviour of adults, Samuel Croxall asks, referencing political alarmism, "when we are alarmed with imaginary dangers in respect of the public, till the cry grows quite stale and threadbare, how can it be expected we should know when to guard ourselves against real ones?".

References

External links

Laura Gibbs' gallery of 15th–20th century book illustrations of the fable

Aesop's Fables
English-language idioms
Fictional shepherds
Fictional wolves
Wolves in folklore, religion and mythology
Big Bad Wolf
Metaphors referring to wolves
ATU 1200-1349